Anita Karlsson (born November 1, 1965 in Ätran) is a Swedish sport shooter. She competed at the 1988 Summer Olympics in the women's 50 metre rifle three positions event, in which she placed eighth, and the women's 10 metre air rifle event, in which she tied for 33rd place.

References

1965 births
Living people
ISSF rifle shooters
Swedish female sport shooters
Shooters at the 1988 Summer Olympics
Olympic shooters of Sweden